The 2003–04 Egyptian Super Cup was the third Egyptian Super Cup, an annual football match played between the winners of the previous season's Egyptian Premier League and Egypt Cup. It was played at Cairo Military Academy Stadium in Cairo, Egypt, on 28 August 2003, contested by Al Ahly and Zamalek.

Al Ahly defeated Zamalek and won the match 3–1 on penalties after being tied 0–0.

Details

References

Egyptian Super Cup
Saudi-Egyptian Super Cup